Albert Vishnyakov (born December 30, 1983) is a Russian professional ice hockey forward.  He currently plays for Metallurg Novokuznetsk in the Kontinental Hockey League (KHL). Vishnyakov was drafted in the 9th round (273rd overall) of the 2003 NHL Entry Draft by the Tampa Bay Lightning.

Career statistics

References

External links

1983 births
Living people
Russian ice hockey left wingers
Ak Bars Kazan players
HC Dynamo Moscow players
Metallurg Novokuznetsk players
HC Neftekhimik Nizhnekamsk players
Torpedo Nizhny Novgorod players
HC Spartak Moscow players
Tampa Bay Lightning draft picks